Pope Urban VII (4 August 1521 – 27 September 1590), born Giovanni Battista Castagna, was head of the Catholic Church, and ruler of the Papal States from 15 to 27 September 1590. His thirteen-day papacy was the shortest in history, during which a smoking ban encompassing churches across the world was implemented.

Biography

Giovanni Battista Castagna was born in Rome in 1521 to a noble family as the son of Cosimo Castagna of Genoa and Costanza Ricci Giacobazzi of Rome.

Castagna studied in universities all across Italy and obtained a doctorate in civil law and canon law when he finished his studies at the University of Bologna. Soon after he became auditor of his uncle, Cardinal Girolamo Verallo, whom he accompanied as datary on a papal legation to France. He served as a constitutional lawyer and entered the Roman Curia during the pontificate of Pope Julius III as the Referendary of the Apostolic Signatura. Castagna was chosen to be the new Archbishop of Rossano on 1 March 1553, and he would quickly receive all the minor and major orders culminating in his ordination to the priesthood on 30 March 1553 in Rome. He then received episcopal consecration a month after at the home of Cardinal Verallo.

He served as the Governor of Fano from 1555 to 1559 and later served as the Governor of Perugia and Umbria from 1559 to 1560. During the reign of Pius IV, he settled satisfactorily a long-standing boundary dispute between the inhabitants of Terni and Spoleto. Castagna would later participate in the Council of Trent from 1562 to 1563 and served as the president of several conciliar congregations. He was appointed as the Apostolic Nuncio to Spain in 1565 and served there until 1572, resigning his post from his archdiocese a year later. He also served as the Governor of Bologna from 1576 to 1577. Among other positions, he was the Apostolic Nuncio to Venice from 1573 to 1577 and served also as the Papal Legate to Flanders and Cologne from 1578 to 1580.

Pope Gregory XIII elevated him to the cardinalate on 12 December 1583 and he was appointed as the Cardinal-Priest of San Marcello.

Papacy

Election

After the death of Pope Sixtus V, a conclave was convoked to elect a successor. Ferdinando I de' Medici, Grand Duke of Tuscany had been appointed a cardinal at the age of fourteen but was never ordained to the priesthood. At the age of thirty-eight, he resigned from the cardinalate upon the death of his older brother, Francesco in 1587, to succeed to the title (there were suspicions that Francesco and his wife died of arsenic poisoning after having dined at Ferdinando's Villa Medici, although one story has Ferdinando as the intended target of his sister-in-law). Ferdinando's foreign policy attempted to free Tuscany from Spanish domination. He was consequently opposed to the election of any candidate supported by Spain. He persuaded Cardinal Alessandro Peretti di Montalto, grand-nephew of Sixtus V, to switch his support from Cardinal Marco Antonio Colonna, which brought the support of the younger cardinals appointed by the late Sixtus.

Castagna, a seasoned diplomat of moderation and proven rectitude was elected as pope on 15 September 1590 and selected the pontifical name of "Urban VII".

Activities
Urban VII's short passage in the office gave rise to the world's first known public smoking ban, as he threatened to excommunicate anyone who "took tobacco in the porchway of or inside a church, whether it be by chewing it, smoking it with a pipe or sniffing it in powdered form through the nose".

Urban VII was known for his charity to the poor. He subsidized Roman bakers so they could sell bread under cost, and restricted the spending on luxury items for members of his court. He also subsidized public works projects throughout the Papal States. Urban VII was strictly against nepotism and he forbade it within the Roman Curia.

Death
Urban VII died in Rome on 27 September 1590, shortly before midnight, of malaria. He had reigned for 13 days. He was buried in the Vatican. The funeral oration was delivered by Pompeo Ugonio. His remains were later transferred to the church of Santa Maria sopra Minerva, on 21 September 1606.

His estate, valued at 30,000 scudi, was bequeathed to the Archconfraternity of the Annunciation, for use as dowries for poor young girls.

See also

List of popes

References

External links

Deaths from malaria
Italian popes
Clergy from Rome
Popes
University of Perugia alumni
1521 births
1590 deaths
16th-century popes
Apostolic Nuncios to the Republic of Venice
Burials at Santa Maria sopra Minerva